Muhammad Al Afghani may refer to:

Mohammed Al Afghani (captive of the CIA), captured in 2004, held by the CIA, location unknown
Muhammad Rahim al Afghani, captured in Lahore in 2008, transferred to Guantanamo